The Cordilleran flycatcher (Empidonax occidentalis) is a small insect-eating bird. It is a small Empidonax flycatcher, with typical length ranging from 13 to 17 cm.

Adults have olive-gray upperparts, darker on the wings and tail, with yellowish underparts; they have a conspicuous teardrop-shaped white eye ring, white wing bars, a small bill and a short tail.  Many species of this genus look closely alike.  The best ways to distinguish species are by voice, by breeding habitat, and by range.  This bird is virtually identical to the Pacific-slope flycatcher. These two species were formerly considered a single species known as western flycatcher. The species were split by the American Ornithologists’ Union in 1989.  The Pacific-slope flycatcher is a breeding bird of the Pacific Coast forests and mountain ranges from California to Alaska; the Cordilleran is a breeding bird of the Rocky Mountains.  They have different songs and calls.

Cordilleran flycatchers' preferred breeding habitat is  pine-oak or coniferous forest, usually near running water. They make a cup nest on a fork in a tree, usually low in a horizontal branch.  Females usually lay two to five eggs.

These birds migrate to Mexico for the winter, where the Mexican central-southern birds are resident. The non-resident birds are on the western coast from Jalisco northwards, and then to inland regions, in a corridor strip on the western flank of the Sierra Madre Occidental.

The Cordilleran flycatcher waits on an open perch of a shrub or low branch of a tree and flies out to catch insects in flight (hawking), and also sometimes picks insects from foliage while hovering (gleaning).

The song includes notes represented as pseet, ptsick, seet usually sung rapidly together. The ptsick or ptik note has the first syllable higher-pitched than the second—the only difference from the Pacific-slope flycatcher's song (Sibley 2000).  The male's typical position call is a loud and distinctive pit pete or tse-seet, but some give a "rising tsweep" or a "slurred tseeweep, like the calls of Pacific-slope flycatchers (Sibley 2000).

References

External links
Videos, photos and sounds - Internet Bird Collection
Photos - VIREO  Photo-High Res
Photo; Article fwp.mt.gov (Montana Fish, Wildlife & Parks)

Cordilleran flycatcher
Native birds of Western Canada
Native birds of the Rocky Mountains
Native birds of the Western United States
Birds of the Great Basin
Birds of the Rio Grande valleys
Birds of Mexico
Birds of the Sierra Madre Occidental
Cordilleran flycatcher
Cordilleran flycatcher